Marc Wauters (born 23 February 1969 in Hasselt, Belgium) is a former Belgian cyclist who was professional from 1991 until 2006. The 2004 Olympian, nicknamed The Soldier was a member of the Rabobank cycling team of the UCI ProTour since 1998 and had to end his career several weeks short because of a broken collarbone which he suffered during a training on 20 September 2006.

Wauters participated at the 2000 Summer Olympics in Sydney and at the 2004 Summer Olympics in Athens where he took part in both the road race and the time trial without any success. In his early career, between 1991 and 1996 he won several of the smaller road races in The Netherlands and Belgium he was cycling in. The only exception to this was his win in the 5th stage of the 1995 Vuelta a Andalucía.

In 1997 and 1998 Wauters didn't win a single race, although he became 7th at the World Cycling Championships 1998, his highest position in this event during his career. From 1999 on after winning the Grand Prix Eddy Merckx he started achieving wins again. In this year he also won Paris–Tours, 2 stages in the Tour de Luxembourg plus the overall ranking and the overall classification in the Rheinland-Pfalz Rundfahrt. Trying to defend his title in Rheinland-Pfalz he won 3rd stage in 2000. At the end of the tour he had defended his title successively. He won the Grand Prix Eddy Merckx for the second time in his career in 2001. Wauters was known as a worker in the peloton and didn't win much, but helped his teammates achieving decent results. Meanwhile, he developed himself into one of Belgium's best time trial specialists, winning the Belgium championships in 2002, 2003 and 2005. At the 2004 World Championships he finished on a 7th position.

On 15 October 2006 a memorial race was held in Zolder, Belgium to wave Wauters officially goodbye from the sport.

Tour de France
Wauters started in a total of 10 Tour de France editions, finishing in Paris eight times. His highest final ranking was 43rd in 2000. The year after, during the 2001 Tour de France Wauters won the second stage, held from Calais to Antwerp. He was part of a breakaway containing 16 cyclists together with teammate Erik Dekker. Wauters got away from the group together with Arnaud Pretot who he beat in the final sprint. Because of his decent result in the prologue two days prior in Dunkerque he wore the yellow jersey for a day, before losing it to Stuart O'Grady.
1993 - 107th
1994 - 92nd
1996 - 124th
1999 - did not finish in Paris
2000 - 43rd
2001 - winner stage 2, did not finish in Paris
2002 - 91st
2003 - 115th
2004 - 112th
2005 - 140th

Major results

1987
1st Belgian junior time trial championships
1991
1st Liedekerkse Pijl
1994
1st Ronde van Limburg
1st Ster van Zwolle
1st Grote Prijs Stad Zottegem - Dr Tistaertprijs
1995
1st Stage 5 Vuelta a Andalucía
1996
1st Sint-Truiden Criterium
1999
1st Grand Prix Eddy Merckx
1st Paris–Tours
1st overall Rheinland-Pfalz Rundfahrt
1st Stage 1 Tour de Luxembourg
1st Stage 4 Tour de Luxembourg
1st overall Tour de Luxembourg
2000
1st Peer Criterium
1st Stage 3 (B) Rheinland-Pfalz Rundfahrt
1st overall Rheinland-Pfalz Rundfahrt
2001
1st Grand Prix Eddy Merckx
1st 2nd stage Tour de France
2002
1st  Belgian National Time Trial Championships
2003
1st  Belgian National Time Trial Championships
2004
1st Kortrijk Criterium
2005
1st  Belgian National Time Trial Championships
2006
1st Peer Criterium
1st 's Gravenwezel Criterium

References

External links

1969 births
Living people
Belgian male cyclists
Cyclists at the 2000 Summer Olympics
Cyclists at the 2004 Summer Olympics
Olympic cyclists of Belgium
Belgian Tour de France stage winners
Sportspeople from Hasselt
Cyclists from Limburg (Belgium)